Albuquerquea is a genus of blow fly in the family Mesembrinellidae.

Species
A. latifrons Mello, 1967

References

Mesembrinellidae
Diptera of South America